Bernard "Lulu" Rosenkrantz (1902 – October 25, 1935) was a New York mobster and Dutch Schultz's chauffeur and bodyguard. He was shot at the Palace Chophouse in Newark, New Jersey, on October 23, 1935, moments after Schultz was shot. He died two days later in the Newark City Hospital.

In 1938, Rosenkrantz and Schultz were named as co-conspirators in an indictment of Tammany Hall political boss James Joseph Hines that led to Hines' conviction for racketeering.

References

External links
Bernard "Lulu" Rosenkrantz

1902 births
1935 deaths
1935 murders in the United States
Murdered Jewish American gangsters
People murdered by Murder, Inc.
Deaths by firearm in New Jersey
People murdered in New Jersey
20th-century American Jews